Birte is a feminine given name which may refer to:

 Birte Bruhns (born 1970), German retired middle-distance runner
 Birte Christoffersen (born 1924), Danish retired diver
 Birte Glang (born 1980), German actress, brand ambassador, fashion model and lawyer
 Birte Høeg Brask (1918–1997), Danish resistance fighter and physician
 Birte Melsen (born 1939), Danish orthodontist
 Birte Ove-Petersen, Danish swimmer
 Birte Siech (born 1967), German rower
 Birte Siim (born 1945), Danish political scientist specializing in gender studies
 Birte Tove (1945–2016), Danish actress and nude model
 Birte Weigang (born 1968), East German former swimmer
 Birte Weiss (born 1941), Danish journalist and politician
 Birte Weiß (born 1971), German footballer

See also
 Birt, a surname

Feminine given names